Screeching Weasel/Born Against split is a split E.P. featuring Screeching Weasel and Born Against. It was released in 1993 on 7" vinyl and CD by Lookout! Records.  "Janelle" prompted a response EP, The Real Janelle, by riot grrrl band Bratmobile, which drew attention to the divide between bratty pop punk and feminist riot grrrl punk.

Vinyl Track listing
Side A (Screeching Weasel)
1. El Mozote
2. Fuck This

Side B (Born Against)
1. Janelle
2. Go Fuck Yourself

CD Track listing
(Screeching Weasel)
1. El Mozote
2. Fuck This
3. Chicago
(Born Against)
4. Janelle
5. Go Fuck Yourself
6. Movin' On Up

References

1993 EPs
Split EPs
Screeching Weasel EPs
Lookout! Records EPs